Morphodactyla is a genus of ground beetles in the family Carabidae. There are about seven described species in Morphodactyla, found in eastern Asia.

Species
These seven species belong to the genus Morphodactyla:
 Morphodactyla alticola (Bates, 1891)  (China)
 Morphodactyla coreica (Jedlicka, 1936)  (North Korea and South Korea)
 Morphodactyla ishikawai (Nemoto, 1990)  (South Korea)
 Morphodactyla kmecoi Lassalle, 2011  (China)
 Morphodactyla potanini Semenov, 1889  (China)
 Morphodactyla sehnali Lassalle, 2011  (China)
 Morphodactyla yulongensis Lassalle, 2011  (China)

References

Carabidae genera
Fauna of Asia